Probolinggo Regency is a regency in East Java province of Indonesia. It covers an area of 1,696.17 sq. km, and had a population of 1,096,244 at the 2010 Census and 1,152,537 at the 2020 Census; the official estimate as at mid 2021 was 1,155,894. Its capital was formerly the city of Probolinggo, but after that city became an independent administrative identity the capital is now at Kraksaan.

History

Indonesian National Revolution 
The Dutch marines landed in Situbondo on 21 July 1947. They didn't meet much resistance from Indonesian forces. Some of them headed west to attacked Probolinggo from the east of the regency. At 16.15 on the same day, the forces supported by armored vehicles already arrived at Kraksaan. At 17.30, they already held the downtown area.

On 22 July morning, the Dutch seized the port of the city. They then set up perimeter near the railway, but met heavy resistance there. At night, Indonesian forces launched a counter-attack that made the Dutch forces pulled back to the port area. On 23 July, the Dutch launched an attack in Ledok Ombo village killing 15 soldiers of Indonesian forces.

Indonesian forces launched small scale attacks to the Dutch defensive posts until early August. They also conducted scorched earth strategy to prevent the Dutch forces utilizing Indonesian facilities and food supply.

Government 
Administration of Probolinggo city (kota) and regency (kabupaten) had repeatedly been separated and merged. There were separation of government of Probolinggo city (kotapraja) and regency based on Ordonantie dated 20 June 1918. But, according on Ordonantie 9 August 1928, the city was abolished and the area was merged again to the regency.

Under Japanese occupation, the administrations were once again separated. The city (under Japanese rule, the level was called shi) mayor (shico) was Gapar Wiryosudibyo, a middle school teacher, while the regency (ken) regent was Nyais Wiryosubroto. Both Probolinggo (shi and ken) were under an administration of Malang-shu (residency).

During National Revolution, on 13 August 1948 the city was abolished again and was absorbed into the regency. Then since the Dutch recognition of Indonesian independence, the city and regency were separated again.

Administrative districts

Late Dutch East Indies era 
In late Dutch East Indies rule, there were 3 districts in Probolinggo regency: Probolinggo, Tongas, and Sukapura. Probolinggo district itself was divided into 5 onderdistriks namely Probolinggo, Kanigaran, Wonoasih, Bantaran, and Leces.

Recent 
Probolinggo Regency consists of twenty-four districts (kecamatan), tabulated below with their areas and population totals from the 2010 Census and the 2020 Census, together with the official estimates as at mid 2021. The table also includes the number of administrative villages (rural desa and urban kelurahan) in each district, and its postal codes.

Notes: (a) excluding the village of Besuk, which has a post code of 67283. (b) includes the offshore island of Pulau Giliketapang.

Tourism
Probolinggo Regency has various tourist attractions including Mount Bromo, white water rafting at Pekalen River, and also the Jabung Buddhist temple.

Rafting at Pekalen River
The location is about 1 hour from Bromo Tengger Semeru National Park which Pekalen river cuts Probolinggo city. With difficulty up to grade 3+, there are many bat caves and also small waterfalls along the cliff of Pekalen river which are difficult to find at other rivers.

References

Bibliography 
 

Regencies of East Java